Renato "Sonny" B. Reyes Jr. (21 September 1944 Mention of Renato Reyes' death</ref> was a Filipino basketball player, father of Vega Onko who competed in the 1968 Summer Olympics.

References

External links
 

1944 births
1997 deaths
Olympic basketball players of the Philippines
Basketball players at the 1968 Summer Olympics
Basketball players at the 1966 Asian Games
Basketball players at the 1970 Asian Games
Philippines men's national basketball team players
Filipino men's basketball players
Asian Games competitors for the Philippines
People from Bacoor
Basketball players from Cavite